A monolith is a monument or natural feature consisting of a single massive stone or rock.

Monolith or monolithic may also refer to:

Architecture
 Monolithic architecture, a style of construction in which a building is carved, cast or excavated from a single piece of material
 Monolithic column, column made from one single piece of stone
 Monolithic dome, structure cast in one piece over a form, made of concrete or similar structural material

Arts and entertainment

Art
 Monolitten, Norwegian for The Monolith, a sculpture in Vigeland Sculpture Park in Norway
 Utah monolith, a metal pillar sculpture in the desert in Utah, U.S.
 Monolith, the Face of Half Dome, a photograph by Ansel Adams

Characters and entities
 Monolith, character from the Elementals comic book series
 Monolith (Space Odyssey), the Monoliths featured in 2001: A Space Odyssey and its sequels
 The Monolith, a faction from the video games S.T.A.L.K.E.R.: Shadow of Chernobyl and others in the same series

Entertainment companies
 Monolith Productions, Washington State–based video game development house and subsidiary of Warner Bros. Interactive Entertainment
 Monolith Soft, Japanese video game developer and subsidiary of Nintendo

Film
 Monolith (1993 film), an American film starring Bill Paxton 
 Monolith (2016 film), an Italian sci-fi thriller starring Katrina Bowden
 Monolith (2022 film), an Australian sci-fi thriller starring Lily Sullivan

Literature
 Monolith (comics), comic book series and the name of its titular character
 Monolith (novel), a 2004 novel by John Passarella

Music
 Monolith Festival, a Colorado music festival
 Monolithic (band), a synthpop band
 Monolith (band), a Bulgarian rock band
 The Monolith Tour, a worldwide tour by American rock band Thirty Seconds to Mars

Albums
 Monolith (Kansas album), 1979
 Monolith (Amebix album), 1987
 Monolith a 2007 album by Buckethead under his Death Cube K alias
 Monolith (In Mourning album), 2010
 Monolith (Sylosis album), 2012
 Monolith (Omid album), 2003

Songs
 "Monolithic", a song by Monster Magnet from the album Monolithic Baby!
 "Monolith", a song by Stone Sour from the album Stone Sour
 "Monolith", a song by T. Rex from the album Electric Warrior
 "Monolith", a song by Yello from the album Pocket Universe
 "Monolith", a song by Wolfmother
 "Monoliths", a song by Maserati
 "Monolith", a song by Jedi Mind Tricks from the album A History of Violence
 "The Monolith", a song by The Beta Band from the E.P The Patty Patty Sound, later included on the compilation album The Three E.P.'s
 "Monolith", a song by Delerium from their 1994 album Spheres
 "Monolith", a song by Cannibal Corpse from their 1996 album Vile
 "Monolith", a song by Mudvayne from their 2000 album L.D. 50
 "The Monolith", a song by Becoming the Archetype from their 2007 album The Physics of Fire
 "Monolith", a song by Youngblood Supercult from their 2016 album High Plains
 "Monolith", a song by Erra from their 2018 album Neon
 "Monolith", a song by Fear Factory from their 2021 album Aggression Continuum

Computers
 Monolithic application, software architecture for computer applications
 Monolithic codebase, repository architecture for source control
 Monolithic kernel, kernel architecture for computer operating systems
 Monolithic system, computer system architecture where processing, data and the user interface all reside on the same system

Electronic circuits
 Monolithic integrated circuit or "monolithic system", an electronic system, such as a processor, realized on a single die
 Monolithic microwave integrated circuit (often abbreviated MMIC), a type of integrated circuit (IC) device that operates at microwave frequencies (300 MHz to 300 GHz)

Places
 Monolith, California, in Kern County
 The Monolith (Antarctica), a pair of Antarctic islets
 Phobos monolith, a rock on Mars' largest moon, Phobos

Other uses
 Monolith (catalyst support), an extruded structure to support catalysts
 Single crystal, unified crystal, also called monocrystal or monolithic

See also

 
 
 
 Mono (disambiguation)
 Lith (disambiguation)